Quercus petraea subsp. polycarpa,  synonyms including Quercus iberica, is a deciduous tree native from Austria to Iran. Its range includes the Caucasus, where it may be called the Georgian oak.

Description
Its is known for its very short stalk and acorns that occur either in pairs or alone.

Distribution
Quercus petraea subsp. polycarpa is native to eastern Europe from Austria to European Turkey, including Bulgaria, Czechoslovakia, Greece, Hungary, Romania ,former Yugoslavia and the Caucasus (including Armenia, Azerbaijan and Georgia) and temperate asia including Turkey and Iran.

In Georgia, the tree is widely distributed throughout the drier regions of eastern Georgia and generally does not like excessively moist or marshy soils, although it can be found in large groves in moist areas of western Georgia as well. It forms forests together with chestnut, hornbeam and maple.

References

petraea polycarpa
Flora of Austria
Flora of Bulgaria
Flora of Czechoslovakia
Flora of Greece
Flora of Hungary
Flora of Iran
Flora of the North Caucasus
Flora of Romania
Flora of the Transcaucasus
Flora of Turkey
Flora of European Turkey
Flora of Yugoslavia
Plants described in 1808